KZMQ (1140 AM) is a radio station broadcasting an oldies music format to the Greybull, Wyoming, United States, area. The station is owned by the Big Horn Radio Network, a division of Legend Communications of Wyoming, LLC. It features programming from Westwood One.

All five stations of the Big Horn Radio Network have their offices and studios located on Mountain View Drive in Cody. The KZMQ transmitter site is on Highway 20, just south of Greybull.

History
In November 2010 KZMQ was granted a U.S. Federal Communications Commission construction permit to change its city of license to Ten Sleep, Wyoming. It expired in November 2013, and KZMQ remains in Greybull.

In the spring of 2014, the format changed from classic country to oldies.

References

External links

ZMQ
Oldies radio stations in the United States
Radio stations established in 1979
1979 establishments in Wyoming
ZMQ
Big Horn County, Wyoming